Dave Oberlé (born 9 January 1953 in Farnborough, Kent, England) is percussionist and lead vocalist with the 1970s band Gryphon. After the band split up in 1977, Oberlé went on to help launch the heavy rock magazine Kerrang!.  He now spends his time with the newly re-formed Gryphon who have completed a new album entitled, ReInvention, and toured during 2018/9. He is also a Director of Small Blue, a computer software company.

In 2014, it was also announced that Oberlé would make a return to progressive rock, as one of the guest vocalists on A Forest of Fey by UK outfit Gandalf's Fist.

In 2016, Gandalf's Fist announced that Oberlé would contribute to their next album The Clockwork Fable.

Discography

With Gryphon
 see Gryphon.

With Gandalf's Fist
 A Forest Of Fey (2014)
 The Clockwork Fable (2016)

References

External links
 Official website for Small Blue
 Official website for Gryphon

1953 births
British male singers
British percussionists
People from Farnborough, London
Living people
Gryphon (band) members